Ryan T. Fox (born October 7, 1986) is an American rowing athlete with the United States Rowing team.

Career
Fox was part of the silver medal winning team at the 2009 World Rowing Championships in Poznan, Poland. Fox also was part of the 2010 National Team that competed valiantly at the 2010 World Rowing Championships at Lake Karapiro, New Zealand . He competed in the 2012 World Rowing Championships at Plovdiv, Bulgaria.

Personal life

Fox enjoys biking, running, collecting vacuum cleaners, and playing video games in the Guitar Hero series.

 Hometown: Edgerton, Wisconsin
 Residence: Oklahoma City, Oklahoma
 High School: Edgerton High School
 Undergraduate Education: University of Wisconsin, Physics and Astronomy, 2010
 Began Rowing: 2005 – University of Wisconsin
 Club Affiliation: Oklahoma City National High Performance Center
 Training Location: Oklahoma City, Oklahoma
 Current Coaches: Brian Volpenhein
 Years on National Team: Four – 2009–2012

Fox was employed by Oklahoma Medical Research Foundation as a programming consultant, writing programming to help with a project tracking rheumatoid arthritis patients’ data. He currently works at Very Large Array in New Mexico.

References

1986 births
Living people
American male rowers
University of Wisconsin–Madison College of Letters and Science alumni
World Rowing Championships medalists for the United States